The Dallara SN01, also known as the Dallara T02, is an open-wheel ground effect formula racing car, designed, developed and built by Italian manufacturer and constructor Dallara, for the one-make World Series by Nissan spec-series, between 2002 and 2004. It was later succeeded by the Dallara T05, in 2005.

References

External links
Dallara Official Website

Renault Sport Series
Open wheel racing cars
T02